Trifolium trichocalyx is a species of clover known by the common name Monterey clover.

Distribution
Trifolium trichocalyx is endemic to Monterey County, California, where it is known only from the Monterey Peninsula, in a closed-cone pine forest habitat.

It occurs in the Del Monte Forest with flora associates Potentilla hickmanii and Piperia yadonii. This species is listed as endangered by the U.S. Federal Government and the state of California.

See also
 Trifolium dubium

References

External links
Calflora Database: Trifolium trichocalyx (Monterey clover)
The Nature Conservancy: Trifolium trichocalyx

trichocalyx
Endemic flora of California
Natural history of Monterey County, California
Plants described in 1904